HD 113703, also known by the Bayer designation f Centauri , is a multiple star system in the southern constellation of Centaurus. The combined apparent visual magnitude of this system is +4.71, which is sufficient to make it faintly visible to the naked eye. The distance to this system is approximately 400 light years based on parallax measurements. It is a member of the Lower Centaurus Crux subgroup of the Scorpius–Centaurus association.

The primary of f Centauri is a blue-white hued B-type main-sequence star with a stellar classification of B4V. It is a young star with an age estimated at around 92 million years, and is spinning rapidly with a projected rotational velocity of 140 km/s. In 2013, a spectroscopic companion to the primary was observed using long baseline interferometry, with the two being designated components Aa and Ab.

A faint, magnitude 10.8 companion, component B, was first reported by J. F. W. Herschel in 1836. As of 2015, it was located at a separation of  along a position angle of 78°. This is a K-type star with a class of K0Ve, showing emission in the Calcium H and K lines. It is a known BY Draconis variable star with the designation V1155 Centauri.  It shares a common space motion with the primary, indicating a probable physical relationship, and its Gaia Data Release 3 parallax of  suggests a distance of 409 light years.  The star shows a strong overabundance in lithium, which demonstrates its young age. It is about 0.8 magnitudes above zero age main sequence and thus is still contracting as a post-T Tauri star. X-ray emission has been detected from this star.

References

B-type main-sequence stars
K-type main-sequence stars
3

Centaurus (constellation)
Centauri, f
Durchmusterung objects
113703
063945
4940
Emission-line stars